Sajjad Ali can refer to:

 Sajjad Ali (born 1966), Pakistani singer and actor
 Sajjad Ali (cricketer, born 1984), Pakistani cricketer
 Sajjad Ali (cricketer, born 1990), Pakistani cricketer